The Miss Arkansas competition is the pageant that selects the representative for the state of Arkansas in the Miss America pageant. Arkansas has won the Miss America title three times (1964, 1982, 2017).

Ebony Mitchell of Harrison was crowned Miss Arkansas 2022 on June 18, 2022, at Robinson Center Auditorium in Little Rock. She competed for the title of Miss America 2023 at the Mohegan Sun in Uncasville, Connecticut in December 2022.

Gallery of past titleholders

Results summary
The following is a visual summary of the past results of Miss Arkansas titleholders at the national Miss America pageants/competitions. The year in parentheses indicates the year of the national competition during which a placement and/or award was garnered, not the year attached to the contestant's state title.

Placements
 Miss Americas: Donna Axum (1964), Elizabeth Ward (1982), Savvy Shields (2017)
 1st runners-up: Rebecca McCall (1946), Frances Anderson (1962), Karen Carlson (1965), Alyse Eady (2011)
 2nd runners-up: Paula Montgomery (1996), Ashton Campbell (2015)
 3rd runners-up: Mary Jennings (1951), Charlotte Simmen (1952), Lacy Fleming (2005)
 4th runners-up: Lencola Sullivan (1981)
 Top 10: Dorris Love (1943), Sally Miller (1959), Donna Connelly (1971), Mary Stuart (1983), Julie Russell (1987), Nicole Bethmann (1994), Erin Wheatley (1999), Brandy Rhodes (2000), Jessie Ward (2001), Eudora Mosby (2006)
 Top 12: Ashlen Batson (2009)
 Top 15: Barbara Brothers (1949), Sarah Slocum (2010), Amy Crain (2014), Loren McDaniel (2016)
 Top 16: Katie Bailey (2008)

Awards

Preliminary awards
 Preliminary Lifestyle and Fitness: Rebecca McCall (1946), Mary Jennings (1951), Charlotte Simmen (1952), Frances Anderson (1962), Donna Axum (1964), Sharon Evans (1968), Paula Roach (1976), Bunnie Holbert (1978), Lencola Sullivan (1981), Elizabeth Ward (1982), Lauren Davidson (2003)
 Preliminary Talent: Barbara Banks (1956), Savvy Shields (2017)

Non-finalist awards
 Non-finalist Talent: Marilyn Morgan (1972), Joyce McCormack (1977), Bunnie Holbert (1978), Regina Hopper (1984), Lisa Stevens (1985), Patti Thorn (1989), Beth Anne Rankin (1995)
 Non-finalist Interview: Whitney Kirk (2004)

Other awards
 Miss Congeniality: Sharon Evans (1968) (tie), Rhonda Pope (1975) (tie), Sloane Roberts (2013)
 America's Choice: Sarah Slocum (2010)
 Dr. David B. Allman Medical Scholarship: Christi Taunton (1986)
 Charles & Theresa Brown Scholarship: Ashton Campbell (2015)
 Quality of Life Award Winners: Claudia Raffo (2019)
 Quality of Life Award Finalists: Kristen Glover (2012)
 STEM Scholarship Award Finalists: Darynne Dahlem (2020)

Winners

Notes

References

External links
 Official website

Arkansas culture
Arkansas
Women in Arkansas
Recurring events established in 1932
1932 establishments in Arkansas